Stratford is an unincorporated community in Ogle County, Illinois, United States.

Notes

Unincorporated communities in Ogle County, Illinois
Unincorporated communities in Illinois